Dipak Bahadur Singh is a Nepalese politician and member of the Rastriya Prajatantra Party. He was elected in 2022 from Makwanpur 1 to the House of Representatives.

See also 

 Rastriya Prajatantra Party

References 

Rastriya Prajatantra Party politicians
Living people
Nepal MPs 2022–present
1961 births
State ministers of Nepal